Grigor Minasyan (born December 23, 1983, in Yerevan) is an Armenian lawyer currently serving as Minister of Justice of Armenia. Formerly he was the Managing partner of AM Law Firm since 2012 and the Director of the Branch of the European Public Law Organization (EPLO) in Yerevan since 2014.

Career 
From 2003 to 2004 Minasyan was a lawyer in a private company.

From 2004 to 2009 he worked at the "Law Institute of the Ministry of Justice of the Republic of Armenia" State Non-Commercial Organisation, holding the positions of Assistant to the Director for Legal Affairs and later Deputy Director for Legal Affairs.

From 2008 to 2020 Minasyan was the Editor-in-chief of "Justice" academic journal (the journal is approved by the Higher Qualification Committee of the Republic of Armenia).

From 2009 to 2010 he worked as a Head of the Department for Relations with the European Court of Human Rights under the Staff of the Ministry of Justice of the Republic of Armenia. At the same time, Minasyan worked as lecturer at the Law College of the "Law Institute of the Ministry of Justice of the Republic of Armenia" State Non-Commercial Organisation and has headed the Chair of Law til 2011.

From 2011 to 2012 he held the position of Expert-Legal Consultant and then re-assigned to the position of Legal Consultant of the Director at the "Law Institute of the Ministry of Justice of the Republic of Armenia" State Non-Commercial Organisation.

Since 2011 Minasyan was the Official Representative of the Republic of Armenia in the European Public Law Organization (EPLO) located in Athens.

In 2012 he was the Head of the Department of Legal Analysis at the Office of the Human Rights Defender of the Republic of Armenia.

Since 2012 Minasyan is a Member of the Chamber of Advocates of the Republic of Armenia.

In 2013 and in 2018 Minasyan has been elected as member of the Council of Elders of Yerevan.

Education 
From 1990 to 2000 Minasyan has studied at Secondary School #8 after A. Pushkin in Yerevan

From 2000 to 2005 he has studied in the Faculty of Law at the Armenian-Russian (Slavonic) University and graduated with honours, and from 2005 to 2008 he has studied at the Public Administration Academy of the Republic of Armenia.

In 2008 Minasyan defended the scientific thesis and received PhD degree.

Personal life 
Minasyan is married with three daughters.

References

Living people
1983 births
Armenian lawyers
Armenian businesspeople